In mathematics, a 2-group, or 2-dimensional higher group, is a certain combination of group and groupoid.  The 2-groups are part of a larger hierarchy of n-groups.  In some of the literature, 2-groups are also called gr-categories or groupal groupoids.

Definition 
A 2-group is a monoidal category G in which every morphism is invertible and every object has a weak inverse.  (Here, a weak inverse of an object x is an object y such that xy and yx are both isomorphic to the unit object.)

Strict 2-groups 
Much of the literature focuses on strict 2-groups.  A strict 2-group is a strict monoidal category in which every morphism is invertible and every object has a strict inverse (so that xy and yx are actually equal to the unit object).

A strict 2-group is a group object in a category of categories; as such, they are also called groupal categories.  Conversely, a strict 2-group is a category object in the category of groups; as such, they are also called categorical groups.  They can also be identified with crossed modules, and are most often studied in that form.  Thus, 2-groups in general can be seen as a weakening of crossed modules.

Every 2-group is equivalent to a strict 2-group, although this can't be done coherently: it doesn't extend to 2-group homomorphisms.

Properties 
Weak inverses can always be assigned coherently: one can define a functor on any 2-group G that assigns a weak inverse to each object and makes that object an adjoint equivalence in the monoidal category G.

Given a bicategory B and an object x of B, there is an automorphism 2-group of x in B, written AutB(x).  The objects are the automorphisms of x, with multiplication given by composition, and the morphisms are the invertible 2-morphisms between these.  If B is a 2-groupoid (so all objects and morphisms are weakly invertible) and x is its only object, then AutB(x) is the only data left in B.  Thus, 2-groups may be identified with one-object 2-groupoids, much as groups may be identified with one-object groupoids and monoidal categories may be identified with one-object bicategories.

If G is a strict 2-group, then the objects of G form a group, called the underlying group of G and written G0.  This will not work for arbitrary 2-groups; however, if one identifies isomorphic objects, then the equivalence classes form a group, called the fundamental group of G and written π1(G).  (Note that even for a strict 2-group, the fundamental group will only be a quotient group of the underlying group.)

As a monoidal category, any 2-group G has a unit object IG.  The automorphism group of IG is an abelian group by the Eckmann–Hilton argument, written Aut(IG) or π2(G).

The fundamental group of G acts on either side of π2(G), and the associator of G (as a monoidal category) defines an element of the cohomology group H3(π1(G),π2(G)).  In fact, 2-groups are classified in this way: given a group π1, an abelian group π2, a group action of π1 on π2, and an element of H3(π1,π2), there is a unique (up to equivalence) 2-group G with π1(G) isomorphic to π1, π2(G) isomorphic to π2, and the other data corresponding.

The element of H3(π1,π2) associated to a 2-group is sometimes called its Sinh invariant, as it was developed by Grothendieck's student Hoàng Xuân Sính.

Fundamental 2-group 
Given a topological space X and a point x in that space, there is a fundamental 2-group of X at x, written Π2(X,x).  As a monoidal category, the objects are loops at x, with multiplication given by concatenation, and the morphisms are basepoint-preserving homotopies between loops, with these morphisms identified if they are themselves homotopic.

Conversely, given any 2-group G, one can find a unique (up to weak homotopy equivalence) pointed connected space (X,x) whose fundamental 2-group is G and whose homotopy groups πn are trivial for n > 2.  In this way, 2-groups classify pointed connected weak homotopy 2-types.  This is a generalisation of the construction of Eilenberg–Mac Lane spaces.

If X is a topological space with basepoint x, then the fundamental group of X at x is the same as the fundamental group of the fundamental 2-group of X at x; that is,
 
This fact is the origin of the term "fundamental" in both of its 2-group instances.

Similarly,
 
Thus, both the first and second homotopy groups of a space are contained within its fundamental 2-group.  As this 2-group also defines an action of π1(X,x) on π2(X,x) and an element of the cohomology group H3(π1(X,x),π2(X,x)), this is precisely the data needed to form the Postnikov tower of X if X is a pointed connected homotopy 2-type.

See also 

 N-group (category theory)
Abelian 2-group

References

External links 

 
 2008 Workshop on Categorical Groups at the Centre de Recerca Matemàtica

Group theory
Higher category theory
Homotopy theory